Institute of Virology or Virology Institute may refer to:

 Institute of Advanced Virology, Kerala, India
 National Institute of Virology, India
 National Institute of Virology (Pakistan), Pakistan
 Virology Institute of the Philippines, Philippines
 Wuhan Institute of Virology, China